At the 1948 Summer Olympics in London, nine events in gymnastics were contested.  Finland led all nations with six gold medals and ten medals overall.

Shortly after the Czechoslovak team arrived in London, 22 year old team member Eliška Misáková was taken ill and confined to an iron lung. She died of infantile paralysis on the same day that her teammates competed. When the Czechoslovak flag was raised at the medal ceremony, it was bordered with a black ribbon.

Medal table

Men's events

Women's events

† Within the sport of artistic gymnastics, although men were recognized with individual medals at the time, the women weren’t.  The list of the individual medalists within this table reflects the individuals who garnered a top-three placement in the team competition on the respective apparatus (or all 3 combined, in the case of the all-around) and who would have been awarded a medal with the rules that commenced with the 1952 Helsinki Summer Olympic Games and that would change periodically at future Olympic Games with respect to the debut of individual finals competitions at the 1972 Munich Summer Olympics and with respect to the New Life rules that made their Olympic debut at the 1992 Barcelona Summer Olympics.

†† Women did not compete on the Uneven Bars apparatus during these Olympic Games.

††† This was the only time that women gymnasts competed on this apparatus at an Olympic Games.

†††† Women’s Floor Exercise was not an event that existed at the time.

Notes
  Other sources claim that Luigi Zanetti (Italy) also won a silver medal and Guido Figone (Italy) also won a bronze medal in the pommel horse event, despite the three gold medals awarded for the three-way first place tie.

References

 
1948
1948 Summer Olympics events
International gymnastics competitions hosted by the United Kingdom
1948 in gymnastics